Wayne P. DeAngelo (born November 5, 1965) is an American Democratic Party politician, who has served in the New Jersey General Assembly since January 8, 2008, where he represents the 14th Legislative District.

Early life 
DeAngelo was born in Trenton, New Jersey. He is a fourth-generation Hamilton Township, Mercer County resident of Italian-American descent. He lives in the township with his wife Toni and their two daughters. DeAngelo attended Steinert High School and the Rupert John Trade School. He is the Assistant Business Manager of International Brotherhood of Electrical Workers Local 269. DeAngelo is a former Hamilton Township Councilman.  DeAngelo and John Bencivengo, Hamilton's mayor, served as Grand Marshals of the 2008 Hamilton Township Columbus Day Parade.

New Jersey Assembly 
DeAngelo was first elected to the Assembly in 2007 winning a close race with his Democratic running mate, incumbent Assemblywoman Linda R. Greenstein against Republicans Adam Bushman and Tom Goodwin and Libertarians Jason M. Scheurer and Ray F. Cragle. While Greenstein won 27% of the total vote, DeAngelo eked out a win by getting 821 more votes than third-place winner Goodwin. He subsequently won another full term to the Assembly with Greenstein in 2009; since 2011, DeAngelo won re-election with Dan Benson.

Committees
DeAngelo serves on the following committees:
Telecommunications and Utilities, Chair
Military and Veterans' Affairs, Vice-Chair
Appropriations

District 14 
Each of the 40 districts in the New Jersey Legislature has one representative in the New Jersey Senate and two members in the New Jersey General Assembly. The representatives from the 14th District for the 2022—23 Legislative Session are:
 Senator Linda R. Greenstein (D)
 Assemblyman Daniel R. Benson (D)
 Assemblyman Wayne DeAngelo (D)

Electoral history

New Jersey Assembly

References

External links
Assemblyman Wayne P. DeAngelo's legislative webpage, New Jersey Legislature
New Jersey Legislature financial disclosure forms:
2012 2011 2010 2009 2008 2007
Assembly Member Wayne P. DeAngelo, Project Vote Smart
Assembly Majority Web site

1965 births
American people of Italian descent
Living people
Democratic Party members of the New Jersey General Assembly
New Jersey city council members
Politicians from Trenton, New Jersey
People from Hamilton Township, Mercer County, New Jersey
Steinert High School alumni
21st-century American politicians